This is the discography of English new wave band the Icicle Works.

Albums

Studio albums

Live albums

Compilation albums

Box sets

Video albums

EPs

Singles

Promotional singles

References

Discographies of British artists
Rock music group discographies
New wave discographies